Our Lady of Nazareth Academy was a private, all-girls, Roman Catholic high school in Wakefield, Massachusetts.  It was located in the Roman Catholic Archdiocese of Boston and operated from 1947 to 2009.

Background
Our Lady of Nazareth Academy was established in 1947 by the Sisters of Charity of Nazareth.

Extracurricular activities
Athletic programs included volleyball, soccer, basketball, softball, and tennis.   Students performed in dramas such as Shakespeare's Hamlet and musicals such as Sweethearts.  Several times drama students participated in the Massachusetts High School Drama Guild One-Act Festival.

Other extracurricular activities included Concert Choir, Student Council, Student Newspaper, Math Team, Environmental Club, Mock Trial, Hope Club, Model U.N and Diversity Club.

Closure
The Sisters of Charity of Nazareth closed the school at the end of the 2009 academic year.

Notes and references

Defunct Catholic secondary schools in Massachusetts
Defunct girls' schools in the United States
Schools in Middlesex County, Massachusetts
Wakefield, Massachusetts
Educational institutions established in 1947
Educational institutions disestablished in 2009
1947 establishments in Massachusetts
Girls' schools in Massachusetts